Peter Joseph 'PJ' Morrison (born 27 February 1998) is a Scottish footballer who plays as a goalkeeper for Falkirk.

He was part of the Motherwell Scottish Youth Cup winning side in 2016 and experienced first-team football during loan spells with Clyde, Albion Rovers, Cowdenbeath and Falkirk, where he kept four clean sheets in eight appearances at the start of the 2020–21 season.

He was called up to the Scotland Under-21 squad for two matches in 2020, but was an unused substitute in two matches.

On 2 June 2022, he was signed to Falkirk.

References

Scottish footballers
Living people
1998 births
Footballers from Bellshill
Scottish Professional Football League players
Motherwell F.C. players
Clyde F.C. players
Falkirk F.C. players
Cowdenbeath F.C. players
Alloa Athletic F.C. players
Ayr United F.C. players
Albion Rovers F.C. players